Bagrichthys hypselopterus is a species of bagrid catfish found in Thailand, Indonesia and Malaysia.  This species reaches a length of 40.0 cm and is commercially fished for human consumption.

References 
 

Bagridae
Fish of Asia
Fish of Thailand
Freshwater fish of Malaysia
Freshwater fish of Indonesia
Fish described in 1852